The following lists events that happened during 1857 in Australia.

Incumbents

Governors
Governors of the Australian colonies:
Governor of New South Wales – Sir William Denison
Governor of South Australia – Sir Richard MacDonnell
Governor of Tasmania – Sir Henry Young
Governor of Victoria – Sir Henry Barkly
Governor of Western Australia as a Crown Colony – Sir Arthur Kennedy

Premiers
Premiers of the Australian colonies:
Premier of New South Wales – Henry Parker to 7 September then Charles Cowper
Premier of South Australia – Boyle Travers Finniss, John Baker, Robert Torrens, Richard Hanson
Premier of Tasmania – William Champ, Thomas Gregson, William Weston, Francis Smith
Premier of Victoria – Dr William Haines, John O'Shanassy

Events
 13 May – St Kilda railway station, Melbourne is opened.
 4 July – Anti-Chinese riots occur in Victoria.
 25 July – Matthew Blagden Hale is consecrated as the first Bishop of Perth in a ceremony at the Lambeth Palace Chapel.
 20 August – The Dunbar is wrecked at the entrance to Sydney Harbour, killing 121 passengers.
 In Victoria, Australia, one adult male in 7 is Chinese.

Births
 6 January – Hugh Mahon, Western Australian politician (born in Ireland) (d. 1931)
 26 February – Alfred Waldron, Australian rules footballer (Carlton) (d. 1929)
 3 March – Robert Hutchinson, Western Australian politician (d. 1918)
 21 March – Alice Henry, suffragist, journalist and trade unionist (d. 1943)
 25 March – Francis Clarke, New South Wales politician (d. 1939)
 9 May – Sir Sidney Kidman, pastoralist and entrepreneur (d. 1935)
 12 May – Arthur Green, Anglican bishop (born in the United Kingdom) (d. 1944)
 31 May – William Story, South Australian politician (d. 1924)
 13 June – Hubert Newman Wigmore Church, poet (d. 1932)
 14 June – Adolphus Taylor, New South Wales politician and journalist (d. 1900)
 25 June – Louis Gabriel, photographer (d. 1927)
 1 August – Jack Harry, cricketer (d. 1919)
 2 August – Allan McDougall, New South Wales politician (d. 1924)
 7 September – John McIlwraith, cricketer (d. 1938)
 19 September – John Livingston, South Australian politician (d. 1935)
 12 November – Samuel Mauger, Victorian politician (d. 1936)
 2 December – Thomas Lavelle, New South Wales politician (d. 1944)
 5 December – Cyril Cameron, Tasmanian politician and soldier (d. 1941)
 21 December – Joseph Carruthers, 16th Premier of New South Wales (d. 1932)

Deaths
 10 May – John Busby, surveyor and civil engineer (born in the United Kingdom) (b. 1765)
 10 August – Frank McCallum, bushranger (born in the United Kingdom) (b. 1823)
 29 August – Archibald Clunes Innes, soldier and pastoralist (born in the United Kingdom) (b. 1799)

References

 
Australia
Years of the 19th century in Australia